The Master of the Fröndenberger Altarpiece was a German painter active at the end of the fourteenth century and the beginning of the 15th whose name is not known.  Between 1410 and 1420 he painted an altarpiece depicting the Virgin Mary for a monastery at Fröndenberger.

14th-century German painters
15th-century German painters
Frondenberger Altarpiece, Master of the